Gwladys Joan Davis (2 June 1911 – 11 October 2004) was a Welsh cricketer who played primarily as a left-arm medium-fast bowler. She appeared in three Test matches for England in 1937, all against Australia. She played domestic cricket for Middlesex.

References

External links
 
 

1911 births
2004 deaths
People from Glamorgan
Welsh women cricketers
England women Test cricketers
Middlesex women cricketers